Pittsburg, Iowa refers to two places in the state of Iowa in the United States:

Pittsburg, Montgomery County, Iowa
Pittsburg, Van Buren County, Iowa